Georges Ambourouet (born 1 May 1986) is a Gabonese professional footballer who plays as a defender for Lozo Sport. Between 2003 and 2016, he made 41 appearances scoring one goal for the Gabon national team.

Club career
Ambourouet was born in Libreville. He started his career in Gabon plying with USM Libreville until 2003 when French club CS Sedan Ardennes signed him. He played with Sedan three seasons, always in Ligue 2 making a total of 26 league appearances scoring once. In 2006, he returned to Gabon and played two seasons with Delta Téléstar Gabon Télécom FC from Libreville. In summer 2008 he moved to Macedonia and signed with FK Makedonija Gjorče Petrov where he won the domestic league. At the winter break of the 2009–10 season he had a short spell with FC Ceahlăul Piatra Neamţ playing in the Romanian Liga I. In summer 2010 he signed with Albanian previous season champions FK Dinamo Tirana. In summer 2011 he was back in Gabon where he played for Missile FC.

He returned to Albania on 28 January 2012, signing for KS Flamurtari Vlorë. In the summer of 2013 he signed for FK Kukësi.

International career
Ambourouet was a regular member of the Gabon national team from 2003 and became one of the most experienced and capped players. He was selected to be part of the Gabon team at the 2010 Africa Cup of Nations.

References

Living people
1986 births
Sportspeople from Libreville
Gabonese footballers
Gabon international footballers
2010 Africa Cup of Nations players
2012 Africa Cup of Nations players
Association football defenders
USM Libreville players
CS Sedan Ardennes players
Delta Téléstar players
FK Makedonija Gjorče Petrov players
CSM Ceahlăul Piatra Neamț players
FK Dinamo Tirana players
Missile FC players
Flamurtari Vlorë players
Olympique Club de Khouribga players
FK Kukësi players
CF Mounana players
Ligue 2 players
Liga I players
Gabonese expatriate footballers
Gabonese expatriate sportspeople in France
Expatriate footballers in France
Expatriate footballers in North Macedonia
Gabonese expatriate sportspeople in Romania
Expatriate footballers in Romania
Gabonese expatriate sportspeople in Albania
Expatriate footballers in Albania
Gabonese expatriate sportspeople in Morocco
Expatriate footballers in Morocco
21st-century Gabonese people
2016 African Nations Championship players
Gabon A' international footballers